Rowan Witt is an Australian film, television and theatre actor. He is best known for his roles in The Book of Mormon, Hamilton, Gloria, She Loves Me, Into The Woods, South Pacific, Dogfight, Home and Away, and The Matrix.

Early life 
Witt was born in Sydney, Australia.

He went to high school at the International Grammar School. Witt's graduating artwork topped the state, and was exhibited at the NSW Art Gallery, and was awarded the Julian Ashton drawing scholarship.

He undertook intensive acting training and received his tertiary degree from the Sydney Conservatorium of Music University, where he majored in Classical Voice.

Witt trained in acting at various institutions including ATYP and NIDA, and has a background in theatre and improv.

Career 
Witt was discovered at an early age and started working in film and television, with roles including The Matrix (credited as "Spoon Boy"), Somewhere in the Darkness, Escape of the Artful Dodger, Underbelly and Home and Away. He was short-listed to the final four for the role of Harry Potter in the series of feature films and was the only Australian actor to be flown to Leavesden Studios in England to screen-test.

After graduating study, Witt performed across Australia in concerts, recitals, oratorios and operas, before making his theatre début at the Sydney Opera House in The Lincoln Centre's production of South Pacific. The production was directed by Bartlett Sher and starred Teddy Tahu Rhodes and Lisa McCune.

This was followed by Witt's breakout role as Jack, in the Australian production of Into The Woods, at the Melbourne Arts Centre, for which he garnered considerable critical acclaim.

Witt was then cast in the Australian premiere of Pasek and Paul's musical, Dogfight, at the Hayes Theatre, as the aggressive Vietnam marine, Bernstein. AussieTheatre named Witt's performance a highlight of 2015, stating "Witt is the kind of actor that musical theatre needs."

Midway through the Dogfight season, Witt was cast and started work on Cameron Mackintosh's production of Les Misérables (25th Anniversary Production) with which he subsequently toured Australia.

Other theatre roles during this time include John Hinckley in the Australian tour of Sondheim's Assassins, Danny in Baby at the Hayes Theatre, Leaf Coneybear in William Finn's The 25th Annual Putnam County Spelling Bee, originated the role of Chandler Bing in the Australian production of Friends: the Musical, and Young Buddy in the acclaimed concert production of Sondheim's Follies – opposite Philip Quast, Debra Byrne, Lisa McCune, and David Hobson.

Witt starred as Elder McKinley in the original Australian cast of The Book of Mormon at The Princess Theatre in Melbourne and the Sydney Lyric Theatre in Sydney, for which he won several awards including a Sydney Theatre Award, and a Helpmann Award nomination.

Witt then starred as the romantic lead, Georg Nowack, in the acclaimed revival of Bock and Harnick's, She Loves Me at the Hayes Theatre, before playing Dean in the successful Sydney premiere of Brandon Jacobs-Jenkins' play, Gloria. For both roles he was nominated for BW and Sydney Theatre Awards.

In 2021, Witt starred opposite Katherine Parkinson (The IT Crowd) in the first Paramount+ original television series, Spreadsheet. And in 2022, Witt was cast in the iconic role of King George III in the Australian production of Hamilton.

Personal life 
Witt has a sister, a pop musician, who performs under the stage name, ELKI.

References 

Living people
21st-century Australian male actors
Helpmann Award winners
Australian male stage actors
Australian male television actors
Australian male film actors
Australian male musical theatre actors
Year of birth missing (living people)
Australian male voice actors
Male actors from Sydney
Australian male child actors
Sydney Conservatorium of Music alumni
National Institute of Dramatic Art alumni
Male Shakespearean actors
Australian people of English descent